The 1994–95 Meistriliiga was the fourth season of the Meistriliiga, Estonia's premier football league. Flora won their second title.

Preliminary round

League table

Results

Championship Tournament
The points obtained during the preliminary round were carried over halved and rounded up.

League table

Results

Meistriliiga Transition Tournament

Relegation play-off

PJK Kalev won 3–2 on aggregate and retained their Meistriliiga spot for the 1995–96 season. Norma were relegated to the 1995-96 Esiliiga.

Top scorers

See also
1994 in Estonian football
1995 in Estonian football
1994–95 Esiliiga

Notes

References
Estonia – List of final tables (RSSSF)

Meistriliiga seasons
1994 in Estonian football
1995 in Estonian football
Estonia